Elijah Matthew Craig is an American film director, screenwriter, and actor. He is best known for writing and directing the cult horror comedy film Tucker & Dale vs Evil.

Early life 
Craig was born and raised in Los Angeles, California, and is Sally Field's second son with Steve Craig. His older brother Peter Craig is a screenwriter and novelist. His half-brother John Craig is a musician. He also has another younger half-brother named Sam Greisman, who is Sally Field's youngest son.

Career
In 2010, Craig wrote and directed the cult horror comedy movie Tucker & Dale vs Evil, which premiered at the Sundance Film Festival and won the audience award at SXSW. His next film Little Evil, starring Evangeline Lilly and Adam Scott, was released on Netflix in September 2017 to positive reviews.

Personal life
Craig is a passionate outdoorsman and worked as an Outward Bound instructor for several years after college. He's led climbing trips up the mountaineers route on Mount Whitney, Aconcagua, Mount Rainier, Pico De Orizaba, and Denali.

Craig married actress, the former Yellow Power Ranger, Sasha Williams in 2004, and together they have 2 children: Noah and Colin.

Filmography

Television

Acting roles

References

External links

American male film actors
People from Los Angeles
American film directors
American male screenwriters
Horror film directors
Living people
Year of birth missing (living people)